Benchball is a team sport played informally in schools and competitively in universities in the United Kingdom. Many varieties of the game are played but invariably include two teams playing on a court with benches placed at opposite ends and one or more balls in play. No definitive version or rules have been established, the name benchball has been given to many games where scoring involves passing a ball to a teammate on a bench.

Benchball as a competitive sport in its own right has been a relatively recent development, it has traditionally been used in schools for developing ball skills and as a preparation for learning netball and basketball.

Rule variations 
The sport as commonly played in schools is typically communicated through word-of-mouth and so many different games have all been called benchball. Some effort has been made in the university community to establish common rules to be used for national competitions. Each of these are played on (typically indoor) courts of variable dimensions.

Netball style 
A competitively viable version of benchball, played by many university societies in the United Kingdom, is very similar to netball. The court is set up with a single bench at each end, and two teams of eight players starting in opposite halves. One player from each team stands on the bench at the opposite end of the court. The game starts with the ball thrown in the air between two players in the centre of the court who compete to knock it back to their teammates. Players can move anywhere on the court, but otherwise passing and moving rules remain the same as in netball, i.e. a player cannot move with the ball but must pass it down the court to their teammates. To score, a player must pass the ball to their teammate on the bench and if successful they join them standing on the bench. The game is won when one team has scored 6 times, i.e. the entire team is on the bench except for one player.

Variants of this style are played with the scorer instead swapping with the player on the bench, such that there is only one player on each bench at a time, and deciding the winner by keeping score.

Dodgeball style 
The other benchball variant played competitively is more akin to dodgeball. It follows the same setup as the netball-style variant with teams of around eight players starting in opposite halves, and one player per team starting on the opposite-end bench. This version though is played with multiple balls, which start distributed along the centre line of the court. Players start lined up at the back line in their half and then race to the middle to collect the balls. Players are free to move whilst holding the ball but must at all times stay within their own half. As in the netball-style rules, points are scored by passing a ball to a teammate on the bench, and after scoring the passing player joins the bench. The game is won once all players on one team are on the opposite bench.

Five-pass benchball 
Also common in schools is a version of the game with passing and moving rules similar to netball, but requiring a team to make exactly five passes before passing to their teammate on the bench. After scoring a player either joins their teammate on the bench or swaps with them, depending on rules being played.

Rugby style 
An alternate version exists, used for training rugby players. It has the same court setup with two teams and one player for each on the opposite bench. In this version players can move with the ball and travel anywhere inside the court, but possession changes hands if the ball-carrier is touched by an apposing player. The ball-carrier can pass in any direction, but can only score by moving beyond the bench and passing backwards to the player on the bench.

Varsity benchball 
From the mid-2010s onwards, benchball has been gaining popularity as a university sport in the United Kingdom. There is now a National Benchball Varsity tournament where active university benchball societies compete against each other in matches with both netball-style and dodgeball-style rules.

University of Birmingham 
The largest of the UK's benchball societies, the University of Birmingham plays benchball with netball-style rules. The society was founded in May 2017, and has been active ever since.

University of Exeter 

At the University of Exeter the game is played by students, using the netball-style rules. The objectives of the Benchball Society include "Provide a frequent variety of socials from bowling to pub quizzes and 3 weekly training/match sessions this year".

University of Sheffield 

The University of Sheffield primarily plays the dodgeball-style rules of benchball. They list among their highlights "[playing at the] yearly Varsity tournament" and "Socials".

Benchball in media

The Tab 

University-level benchball has been the subject of multiple articles by university news site The Tab, and mentioned in several others.

Other references in news sources 

 An article from BBC News discussing "alternative sports" mentions a benchball tournament amongst schools in Derby.
 A 2019 Oxford Mail article mentions benchball being played at a childrens' holiday camp.
 Somerset Live highlights benchball, among rugby and table tennis, as a key sport on offer at a local sixth form college.

References in other media 
The 2009 book "Cross My Heart" by Helen Slavin mentions “the wet-weather game of Benchball in the assembly hall.”

See also
Prisonball

Notes

External links
Benchball at playworks.org
"How to Play Benchball", Christchurch Junior School, Christchurch, Dorset
"UR Benchball Rules", vancouver.urbanrec.ca
Benchball at teachingideas.co.uk
Benchball at YouTube
Official UoB Benchball Society at Instagram
Exeter University Benchball Society at Instagram
Uni of Sheffield Benchball at Instagram

Team sports